Xintang Station may refer to:

 Xintang station (Guangzhou Metro), a station on the Guangzhou Metro in Guangzhou, Guangdong
 Xintang railway station, a station on Guangzhou–Shenzhen railway in Xintang, Zengcheng, Guangzhou, Guangdong, China
 Xintang South railway station (Xintangnan railway station), formerly known as Xintang railway station, a station on Guangzhou–Shenzhen intercity railway in Xintang, Zengcheng, Guangzhou, Guangdong, China
 Xintang station (Hangzhou Metro), a station on the Hangzhou Metro in Hangzhou, Zhejiang